Fiddler on the Roof was one of the most successful musicals of the "golden age of musicals".  Its original Broadway production in 1964 was the first run of a musical in history to surpass the 3,000 performance mark. Fiddler held the record for the longest-running Broadway musical for almost 10 years until Grease surpassed its run.  The production was extraordinarily profitable and highly acclaimed.  A successful 1971 film adaptation, and the show has enjoyed enduring international popularity, continuing to be a very popular choice for school and community productions.

The original production was nominated for ten Tony Awards, winning nine, including Best Musical, score, book, direction, and Robbins won for best direction and choreography.  Zero Mostel and Maria Karnilova won as best leading actor and actress.  In 1972, the show won a special Tony on becoming the longest-running musical in Broadway history. Its revivals have also been honored.  At the 1981 Tony Awards, Bernardi was nominated as best actor.  Ten years later, the 1991 revival won for best revival, and Topol was nominated as best actor.  The 2004 revival was nominated for six Tony Awards and three Drama Desk Awards but won none.  The 2007 West End revival was nominated for Olivier Awards for best revival, and Goodman was nominated as best actor.

The musical's major awards and nominations are listed below:

Original Broadway production

1981 Broadway revival

1990 Broadway revival

2004 Broadway revival

2007 London revival

2015 Broadway revival

2018 Yiddish production

2019 West End revival

Notes

References

External links

Fiddler on the Roof at Ovrtur
 Longest-running plays on Broadway, Off-Broadway, London, Toronto, Melbourne, Paris, Vienna, and Berlin 
 List of longest-running Broadway productions from Playbill.com

 

Fiddler on the Roof
Fiddler on the Roof